Sergey Nikolayevich Abeltsev (born 6 May 1961 in Lyubertsy, Russian SFSR) is a member of the State Duma of Russia and a former bodyguard of Vladimir Zhirinovsky. He has been a member of the State Duma's Committee on National Security since December 2003 and a member of the Liberal Democratic Party of Russia. Prior to his election to the State Duma, Abeltsev was a member of the LDPR Supreme Council. He has degrees in management, law, and military science.

Controversial activities
He said: "Renaissance came to Europe only after the Inquisition. We must learn from the lessons of History".

Abeltsev has publicly proposed that Yevgeny Adamov, former Russian atomic energy minister, should be assassinated to prevent him from disclosing state secrets in Switzerland.  In June 2009, Abeltsev, in an interview with the Georgian television channel Rustavi 2, advised the U.S. Assistant Secretary of State Philip Gordon to change his family name to a more resonant one — Condom and to give up politics and run a sex shop at the White House. He later claimed he had been provoked by the Georgian journalists, but refused to withdraw his remarks regarding Gordon.

References

External links
 Official website
 Instagram
 VK
 Profile at State Duma website
 Profile at the LDPR website
 Article about him at grani.ru

1961 births
Living people
People from Lyubertsy
Liberal Democratic Party of Russia politicians
Russian nationalists
Recipients of the Medal of the Order "For Merit to the Fatherland" II class
Military Academy of the General Staff of the Armed Forces of Russia alumni
First convocation members of the State Duma (Russian Federation)
Second convocation members of the State Duma (Russian Federation)
Fourth convocation members of the State Duma (Russian Federation)
Fifth convocation members of the State Duma (Russian Federation)
Scholars of criminal law